Swieciechow may refer to the following places in Poland:
Świeciechów, Łódź Voivodeship
Święciechów, West Pomeranian Voivodeship